Olathe West High School is a public high school located in Olathe, Kansas, United States, serving students in grades 9–12. The school is one of five high schools in the Olathe USD 233 school district. The school colors are royal blue, silver, and navy, and the school mascot is the Owl.

History
Olathe West was established in 2017 to help educate the rapidly increasing population of Olathe. Being the fifth high school within the Olathe School District, it was designed using architecturally advanced techniques to create an innovative and futuristic learning environment for its students.

Academics
Spanning 375,000 square feet, Olathe West's three-story school focuses on the use of technology, open, modular learning spaces, efficiency and collaboration among students. A centrally-located learning commons provides student gathering and education collaboration spaces that connect to the entire building. The school is designed with four wings, or communities, where students will attend classes. The building also includes a media center, performing arts center, gymnasiums and practice fields for athletics.

The main auditorium has 789 seats (including retractable seating.) The school also has a 200-square-foot rooftop greenhouse and 60 planting boxes on the growing wall next to the main library on the first floor. The school also features 32 conference rooms.

As Olathe West High School focuses on "Project Based Learning", it has eight maker spaces that include 3-D printers. Four satellite-libraries are located in the student communities, overlooking the main first-floor library.

Extracurricular activities
Olathe West is a member of the Kansas State High School Activities Association and offers a variety of sports programs. Extracurricular activities are also offered in the form of performing arts, school publications, and clubs.

Athletics

Soccer, Boys
One of the most successful athletic programs offered at Olathe West is soccer. In their third season, the boys' soccer team won the Kansas state championship on Saturday, November 9, 2019 against Blue Valley West with a score of 2–1. The first goal was scored by junior Henry Curnow and the second by senior Jony Munoz.

Bowling
Won their first ever individual state title in bowling with Michael Anderson in 2019.

Wrestling
Freshman Makayla Rivera, at the 235-pound weight, placed second in state in 2019.

List of all athletic programs 

 Baseball
 Basketball, Boys
 Basketball, Girls
 Cross Country
 Football
 Golf, Boys
 Golf, Girls
 Gymnastics
 Soccer, Girls
 Softball
 Swimming and Diving
 Tennis, Boys
 Tennis, Girls
 Track and Field
 Volleyball

State Championships

Non-athletic programs

Band
The Olathe West band program includes over one hundred students. There are two concert ensembles: the Concert Band, Symphonic Band the latter forming the marching band during the fall. The schools' marching band has performed at football and school spirit assemblies. Their field shows have been "Words" (2018) and "The Suite Life" (2019). Olathe West also includes a Jazz Band as well as voluntary Percussion Ensembles and PEP Band for Basketball games.

List of all other Non-athletics Programs 

 Art Club
 Cheer
 Dance Team
 Debate / Forensics
 DECA
 Future Teachers
 Hispanic Leadership Club
 Link Leaders
 Orchestra
 O.W.L.S. - Olathe West Leadership Squad
 Theatre
 The Owl Post
 StuCo - Student Council
 Yearbook

Honor Societies 
 National Honor Society
 Rho Kappa - National Social Studies Honor Society

See also
 List of high schools in Kansas
 List of unified school districts in Kansas
Other high schools in Olathe USD 233 school district
 Olathe East High School in Olathe
 Olathe North High School in Olathe
 Olathe Northwest High School in Olathe
 Olathe South High School in Olathe

References

External links
 
 Olathe USD 233 School District

Public high schools in Kansas
Education in Olathe, Kansas
Schools in Johnson County, Kansas
2017 establishments in Kansas